The 1902 Vermont gubernatorial election took place on September 2, 1902. Incumbent Republican William W. Stickney, per the "Mountain Rule", did not run for re-election to a second term as Governor of Vermont. Republican candidate John G. McCullough defeated Local Option candidate Percival W. Clement and Democratic candidate Felix W. McGettrick to succeed him. Since no candidate won a majority of the popular vote, the election was decided and McCullough was elected by the Vermont General Assembly in accordance with the state constitution.

Results

References

Vermont
1902
Gubernatorial
September 1902 events